Reijola is a district located on Western major district of Helsinki, Finland. It consists of three subareas: Laakso, Ruskeasuo and Meilahti.

, Reijola has 15,090 inhabitants living in an area of 4.34 km2.

References 

Districts of Helsinki